The Canton of Arras-Sud is a former canton situated in the department of the Pas-de-Calais and in the Nord-Pas-de-Calais region of northern France. It was disbanded following the French canton reorganisation which came into effect in March 2015. It had a total of 31,968 inhabitants (2012, without double counting).

Composition
The canton comprised 9 communes:

Achicourt
Agny
Arras (partly)
Beaurains
Fampoux
Feuchy
Neuville-Vitasse
Tilloy-lès-Mofflaines
Wailly

See also
Cantons of Pas-de-Calais 
Communes of Pas-de-Calais 
Arrondissements of the Pas-de-Calais department

References

Arras-Sud
Arras
2015 disestablishments in France
States and territories disestablished in 2015